LJX or ljx may refer to:

 Lyndon John X, Canadian reggae and ska musician
 ljx, the ISO 639-3 code for Yuru language, Queensland, Australia